Count Mihály Viczay de Loós et Hédervár (25 July 1757 – 18 March 1831) was a Hungarian numismatist, amateur archaeologist, collector. He was a member of the old noble Viczay family.

Life
His parents were Count Ferenc Mihály, Sr. and Countess Terézia Draskovich. At first, he studied law, but very interested in archeology, so he retired to Hédervár, where antiques and had already accumulated a collection of coins. One of the most beautiful museum was his private collection in his birthplace, where a large number of foreign scientists visited. Among others, like the Italian Sestini and English writer Robert Towns also commemorated those collections.

He married Countess Mária Anna Grassalkovich de Gyarak on 15 June 1775. They had three children:
 Mihály (1777–?): he married Countess Mária Zichy de Zich et Vásonkeő.
 Ferenc (1780–1836): his wife was Countess Amália Zichy de Zich et Vásonkeő. One of their children was Count Héder Viczay.
 Karolina (1789–1839): her husband was Count Antal II Khuen de Belás. Their grandchild was Károly Khuen-Héderváry who later served as Prime Minister of Hungary twice.

External links
 Hungarian Biographical Lexicon 

1757 births
1831 deaths
Hungarian numismatists
Hungarian archaeologists
Mihaly